The Missile Impact Location System or Missile Impact Locating System (MILS) is an ocean acoustic system designed to locate the impact position of test missile nose cones at the ocean's surface and then the position of the cone itself  for recovery from the ocean bottom. The systems were installed in the missile test ranges managed by the U.S. Air Force.

The systems were first installed in the Eastern Range, at the time the Atlantic Missile Range, and secondly in the Pacific, then known as the Pacific Missile Range. The Atlantic Missile Impact Location System and Pacific Missile Impact Location System were installed from 1958 through 1960. Design and development was by American Telephone and Telegraph Company (AT&T), with its Bell Laboratories research and Western Electric manufacturing elements and was to an extent based on the company's technology and experience developing and deploying the Navy's then classified Sound Surveillance System (SOSUS). Early studies were done at Bell Laboratories' Underwater Systems Development Department examined the problem then the Bell System's other organizations began implementation. The company and Navy assets that had installed the first phase of SOSUS, starting in 1951, were engaged on MILS installation and activation.

MILS took several forms and each had a unique configuration based on purpose and local water column and bottom conditions. The target arrays were bottom fixed hydrophones connected by cable to the shore stations. A variant, Sonobuoy MILS (SMILS), was composed of bottom mounted hydrophones augmented by air dropped sonobuoys when in use. The third covered wide ocean areas with fixed hydrophones at distant shore sites was termed broad ocean area (BOA) MILS.

Target arrays
The target arrays received the acoustic effect of an object's impact with the ocean surface then by the effect of an explosive charge with location calculated by the difference in arrival times at the hydrophones arranged to form a rough pentagon with a sixth hydrophone at the center. A particular advantage of the pentagon configuration was that a rapid approximate position could be calculated on simple time sequence of the acoustic wave at the hydrophones with detailed analysis producing a more exact location. The effectiveness depended on placement of the hydrophone in the deep sound channel. Since the downrange islands did not offer ocean bottom at that depth in the required configuration a system of suspended hydrophones was used. The difficulty of computing the calibration results for the Atlantic systems led to development of computer programs that became the standard for MILS operational data solutions. The distant placement of the systems revealed the limitations of the existing world geodetic system with various datum systems based on the local geoid, something that would be solved by satellite systems that would develop the means to tie everything together. Target arrays were high accuracy systems usually covering a target area of about  radius.

The Pacific Missile Range (PMR), then Navy managed as a complex of ranges, was one of the three national missile ranges. PMR began installation of a Pacific MILS to support Intermediate Range Ballistic Missile (IRBM) tests with impact areas northeast of Hawaii. That system terminated at the Marine Corps Air Station Kaneohe Bay. The IRBM array was operational November 1958. Tests of the Intercontinental Ballistic Missile (ICBM) required MILS monitoring impacts between Midway Island and Wake Island and between Wake Island and Eniwetok. The ICBM range was operational in May 1959 with two target arrays. Shore facilities were at Kaneohe and each of the islands.

Broad ocean area (BOA MILS)

This system has less accuracy but extensive coverage area including whole ocean basins. It would cover test vehicles not making the target or other events not directly related to the accuracy tests. Accuracy was improved by pre test calibration by a ship precisely located by a fixed transponder field releasing SOFAR bombs. The BOA hydrophones were located near the deep sound channel axis and were located at Cape Hatteras, Bermuda, Eleuthera (Bahamas), Grand Turk, Puerto Rico,  Antigua, Barbados and Ascension. In the Pacific a BOA system was installed to cover the Wake—Eniwetok—Midway impact area.

Experimental and other uses
The BOA MILS sites were involved in events beyond missile testing. Those included both intentional experiments and acoustic incidents in which they were tasked after the fact to examine records. In some experiments MILS was a major participant while in others participation was mainly monitoring and contributing data.

An example of that monitoring role is the nuclear shot "Sword Fish" in Operation Dominic in which both MILS and SOSUS operated normally simply making recordings and strip charts for a period before the detonation until several hours after. Data has also been provided to support research and support for the International Monitoring System monitoring for nuclear weapons tests. That effort also monitors earthquakes.

Acoustic propagation research

The Kaneohe BOA array, then part of the Pacific Missile Range, was used in the Long Range Acoustic Propagation Project (LRAPP) series of experiments designated Pacific Acoustics Research Kaneohe—Alaska (PARKA). The experiment was required to develop improved models for predicting performance of antisubmarine detection systems and explain the long detection ranges of two to three thousand miles being observed by SOSUS.

The MILS hydrophones at Midway and the SOSUS array at Point Sur were also used in the experiment.

Heard Island Feasibility Test

The Ascension BOA site had twelve hydrophones in six pairs cabled to the island. All but two pairs were suspended near the deep sound channel. After amplification the signals were fed into a signal processing system.

Ascension was one of the observing sites for the Heard Island Feasibility Test conducted to observe both the strength and quality of signals traveling at inter-ocean distances and whether those signals were capable of being used in ocean acoustic tomography. A source ship, near Heard Island in the Indian Ocean generated signals that were received at Ascension at some  distance after passing around Africa. Those signals were received as far away as receiving sites and ships on the east and west coasts of North America.

Vela incident
The Ascension array was one of the systems involved in the Vela incident acoustic signal. Three hydrophones correlated acoustic arrivals with the time and estimated location of the double flash detected by the Vela satellite. The detailed study of the Naval Research Laboratory that was based on models from French nuclear testing in the Pacific concluded the acoustic detection was of a near surface nuclear explosion in the vicinity of the Prince Edward Islands.

Sonobuoy MILS (SMILS)
SMILS was exclusively used to support the Navy's fleet ballistic missile programs under the Strategic Systems Project Office with much of the information classified. The range supported the fixed transponder arrays of ten transponders each on a reimbursable basis.

SMILS was not dependent on an island downrange and intended for use in remote ocean areas. The transponders were fixed with the sonobuoy field deployed as needed. The specially equipped aircraft did immediate processing with detailed analysis performed later ashore. A special sonobuoy interrogated the transponder field for position of the sonobuoy pattern to the geodetic referenced transponders and another special sonobuoy established the relative of the sonobuoys within the pattern. Before the sonobuoy deployment a special buoy gathered the data to determine actual sound velocity at various depths at deployment time. Data could be collected by specially modified Navy P-3 aircraft or an Advanced Range Instrumentation Aircraft. The P-3 aircraft, flown from Naval Air Station Patuxent River by Air Test and Evaluation Squadron One, were modified to receive and record more sonobuoys, a special timing system and a monitoring and quick look capability. The sonobuoys were modified standard types, in particular with additional battery life and frequencies.

Footnotes

References

Bibliography

 

Sonar
Military sonar equipment of the United States
Installations of the United States Air Force